Khobna (also written Krebna) is a village in the commune of Trifaoui, in Hassi Khelifa District, El Oued Province, Algeria.

References

Neighbouring towns and cities

Populated places in El Oued Province